Club de Soccer Saint-Laurent is a Canadian semi-professional soccer club based in Saint-Laurent, Quebec that plays in the Première Ligue de soccer du Québec.

History
Established as a youth soccer club, the club was founded in 1982. As part of their 40th anniversary in 2022, the club unveiled a new logo, incorporating several elements of their arrondissement's coat of arms and logo while preserving the shape of its old coat of arms – the crown at the top symbolizing the coat of arms of Saint-Laurent, the three points of the latter refer to the three spheres of the Borough's emblem, representing the three main cultural communities at the time of its creation (the French, English and Jewish populations), and the triangular shape in the centre representing mountain peaks.

It was announced that they would enter the men's division of Première Ligue de soccer du Québec starting in 2022. Their desire to join the PLSQ had begun five years earlier, but they delayed their entry as they waited for some of their youth players to age, as well as due to the COVID-19 pandemic. Their debut match occurred on May 7 against Ottawa South United, which they won 6–0. They finished in second place in their inaugural season.

Seasons

References

Soccer clubs in Montreal
Saint-Laurent, Quebec
Saint-Laurent
Association football clubs established in 1982